Angus Groom (born 16 June 1992) is a British rower. He is a silver medallist at the 2020 Summer Olympics. He has also won two World Cup gold medals, two World Cup silver medals, a World Cup bronze and European championship bronze.

Career
Groom learnt to row in 2005 at Walton Rowing Club, and first represented Britain at the GB-France Match in 2008 before going on to row at the World Rowing Junior Championships. From 2010 to 2013 he read for a degree in Natural Sciences at Durham University as a member of Hatfield College.  In 2013, he was named as Team Durham’s Sportsman of the Year after winning all three BUCS Championship sculling events and helping Durham claim the Victor Ludorum for a tenth successive year. He was a member of the Scotland Team at the 2014 Commonwealth Rowing Championships.

He competed in the men's quadruple sculls event at the 2016 Summer Olympics.

At the 2020 Summer Olympics held in 2021 in Tokyo, Groom won a silver together with Harry Leask, Tom Barras and Jack Beaumont in the Men's quadruple sculls. Groom announced his retirement from international rowing after the Games to start a career as research scientist in medical science after studying at the University of Oxford.

Following the Olympics, Groom rowed for the Oxford University Boat Club in 2022. It was in this year that Oxford ended Cambridge's run of wins in The Boat Race, claiming victory by two and a quarter lengths.

References

External links
 

1992 births
Living people
Alumni of Hatfield College, Durham
British male rowers
Durham University Boat Club rowers
Sportspeople from Glasgow
Scottish male rowers
Olympic rowers of Great Britain
Rowers at the 2016 Summer Olympics
Rowers at the 2020 Summer Olympics
Medalists at the 2020 Summer Olympics
Olympic silver medallists for Great Britain
Olympic medalists in rowing
Scottish Olympic medallists